Manzanola Bridge was a truss bridge which was originally built in 1911 by the Patterson-Burghardt Bridge Company over the Colorado River and later moved over the Arkansas River (on Colorado State Highway 207) in the year 1950. The bridge used to connect the town of Manzanola, Otero County, with Crowley County in Colorado.

History
The first Manzanola Bridge was built in 1908, near Clifton in Mesa County over the Colorado River. It was replaced by a new design in 1950 and moved to a new location over the Arkansas River connecting Manzanola, Colorado with Crowley County, Colorado. At the new location, the new bridge replaced a "three-span pinned truss" which was built in 1908.

On June 24, 1985, the bridge was added to the National Register of Historic Places. In 1994, it was demolished and a more modern structure was constructed to handle the traffic of Colorado State Highway 207.

The 1950s structure was considered one of the earliest rigid-connected vehicular trusses in Colorado and one of seven riveted Pennsylvania through-truss bridges. At the time of its existence, it was recorded as the longest span roadway truss in the state.

On July 7, 1994, the bridge's name was removed from the National Register of Historic Places.

Gallery
This gallery consists of the photographs taken for the Historic American Engineering Record, dated August 18, 1983.

See also
List of bridges documented by the Historic American Engineering Record in Colorado

References

External links

Buildings and structures completed in 1911
Demolished bridges in the United States
Demolished buildings and structures in Colorado
Historic American Engineering Record in Colorado
National Register of Historic Places in Crowley County, Colorado